Eothalassius is a genus of flies in the family Dolichopodidae. It contains four described species, from Southeast Asia, Papua New Guinea, Costa Rica and the Mediterranean. It also contains three undescribed species, one from New Caledonia and two from Japan.

Species
Eothalassius borkenti Cumming & Brooks, 2011 – Costa Rica
Eothalassius gracilis Shamshev & Grootaert, 2005 – Thailand, Indonesia (Irian Jaya), Papua New Guinea
Eothalassius merzi (Gatt, 2003) – Cyprus, Malta, Mediterranean coast of Turkey
Eothalassius platypalpus Shamshev & Grootaert, 2005 – Papua New Guinea

References

Dolichopodidae genera
Parathalassiinae